Band of Gypsys 2 is a posthumous live album by American rock musician Jimi Hendrix, released in October 1986 by Capitol Records. Produced by Alan Douglas, it followed the live mini LP Johnny B. Goode (1986), which also included live recordings from the Atlanta International Pop Festival (1970) and the Berkeley Community Theatre (1970).

The LP went out-of-print and was never released on CD, but all of the tracks are included on more recent albums, such as Songs for Groovy Children: The Fillmore East Concerts (2019), Freedom: Atlanta Pop Festival (2015), and Live at Berkeley (2003).

Critical reception 
In a contemporary review for The Village Voice, music critic Robert Christgau gave Band of Gypsys 2 an "A−" and said he preferred it over the original Band of Gypsys (1970) record because it lacks the "brotherhood bromides" that were on that album's second side. He added that the versions of classic Hendrix songs on this record's second side "sound a lot fresher now than they would have fifteen years ago, and not just because pressing techniques have taken such a leap". Paul Evans gave the album three-and-a-half out of five stars in The Rolling Stone Album Guide (1992).

Track listing

Personnel
Jimi Hendrix – guitar, vocals
Billy Cox – bass guitar
Buddy Miles – drums on "Hear My Train A Comin'", "Foxy Lady"; drums and vocals on "Stop"
Mitch Mitchell – drums on "Voodoo Child (Slight Return)", "Stone Free", "Ezy Ryder", "Hey Joe", "Hey Baby (New Rising Sun)", and "Lover Man"

References

External links 
 

Live at the Fillmore East albums
Live albums published posthumously
Jimi Hendrix live albums
1986 live albums
Albums produced by Alan Douglas (record producer)
Capitol Records live albums